Lichenology is the branch of mycology that studies the lichens, symbiotic organisms made up of an intimate symbiotic association of a microscopic alga (or a cyanobacterium) with a filamentous fungus.

Study of lichens draws knowledge from several disciplines: mycology, phycology, microbiology and botany. Scholars of lichenology are known as lichenologists.

History

The beginnings

Lichens as a group have received less attention in classical treatises on botany than other groups although the relationship between humans and some species has been documented from early times. Several species have appeared in the works of Dioscorides, Pliny the Elder and Theophrastus although the studies are not very deep. During the first centuries of the modern age they were usually put forward as examples of spontaneous generation and their reproductive mechanisms were totally ignored. For centuries naturalists had included lichens in diverse groups until in the early 18th century a French researcher Joseph Pitton de Tournefort in his Institutiones Rei Herbariae grouped them into their own genus. He adopted the Latin term lichen, which had already been used by Pliny who had imported it from Theophrastus but up until then this term had not been widely employed. The original meaning of the Greek word λειχήν (leichen) was moss that in its turn derives from the Greek verb λείχω (liekho) to suck because of the great ability of these organisms to absorb water. In its original use the term signified mosses, liverworts as well as lichens. Some forty years later Dillenius in his Historia Muscorum made the first division of the group created by Tournefort separating the sub-families Usnea, Coralloides and Lichens in response to the morphological characteristics of the lichen thallus.

After the revolution in taxonomy brought in by Linnaeus and his new system of classification lichens are retained in the Plant Kingdom forming a single group Lichen with eight divisions within the group according to the morphology of the thallus. The taxonomy of lichens was first intensively investigated by the Swedish botanist Erik Acharius (1757–1819), who is therefore sometimes named the "father of lichenology". Acharius was a student of Carl Linnaeus. Some of his more important works on the subject, which marked the beginning of lichenology as a discipline, are:

 Lichenographiae Suecia prodromus (1798)
 Methodus lichenum (1803)
 Lichenographia universalis (1810)
 Synopsis methodica lichenum (1814)

Later lichenologists include the American scientists Vernon Ahmadjian and Edward Tuckerman and the Russian evolutionary biologist Konstantin Merezhkovsky, as well as amateurs such as Louisa Collings.

Over the years research is shedding new light into the nature of these organisms still classified as plants. A controversial issue surrounding lichens since the early 19th century is their reproduction. In these years a group of researchers faithful to the tenets of Linnaeus considered that lichens reproduced sexually and had sexual reproductive organs, as in other plants, independent of whether asexual reproduction also occurred. Other researchers only considered asexual reproduction by means of Propagules.

19th century

Against this background appeared the Swedish botanist Erik Acharius disciple of Linnaeus, who is today considered the father of lichenology, starting the taxonomy of lichens with his pioneering study of Swedish lichens in Lichenographiae Suecicae Prodromus of 1798 or in his Synopsis Methodica Lichenum, Sistens omnes hujus Ordinis Naturalis of 1814. These studies and classifications are the cornerstone of subsequent investigations. In these early years of structuring the new discipline various works of outstanding scientific importance appeared such as Lichenographia Europaea Reformata published in 1831 by Elias Fries or Enumeratio Critico Lichenum Europaeorum 1850 by Ludwig Schaerer in Germany.

 But these works suffer from being superficial and mere lists of species without further physiological studies. It took until the middle of the 19th century for research to catch up using biochemical and physiological methods. In Germany  and Johann Bayrhoffer, in France Edmond Tulasne and Camille Montagne, in Russia Fedor Buhse, in England William Allport Leighton and in the United States Edward Tuckerman began to publish works of great scientific importance.

Scientific publications settled many unknown facts about lichens. In the French publication Annales des Sciences Naturelles in an article of 1852 "Memorie pour servir a l'Histoire des Lichens Organographique et Physiologique" by Edmond Tulasne, the reproductive organs or apothecia of lichens was identified.

These new discoveries were becoming increasingly contradictory for scientists. The apothecium reproductive organ being unique to fungi but absent in other photosynthetic organisms. With improvements in microscopy, algae were identified in the lichen structure, which heightened the contradictions. At first the presence of algae was taken as being due to contamination due to collection of samples in damp conditions and they were not considered as being in a symbiotic relation with the fungal part of the thallus. That the algae continued to multiply showed that they were not mere contaminants.

It was Anton de Bary a German mycologist who specialised in phytopathology who first suggested in 1865 that lichens were merely the result of parasitism of various fungi of the ascomycetes group by nostoc type algae and others. Successive studies such as those carried out by Andrei Famintsyn and Baranetzky in 1867 showed no dependence of the algal component upon the lichen thallus and that the algal component could live independently of the thallus. It was in 1869 that Simon Schwendener demonstrated that all lichens were the result of fungal attack on the cells of algal cells and that all these algae also exist free in nature. This researcher was the first to recognise the dual nature of lichens as a result of the capture of the algal component by the fungal component. In 1873 Jean-Baptiste Edouard Bornet concluded form studying many different lichen species that the relationship between fungi and algae was purely symbiotic. It was also established that algae could associate with many different fungi to form different lichen phenotypes.

20th century

In 1909 the Russian lichenologist Konstantin Mereschkowski presented a research paper "The Theory of two Plasms as the basis of Symbiogenesis, A new study on the Origin of Organisms", which aims to explain a new theory of Symbiogenesis by lichens and other organisms as evidenced by his earlier work "Nature and Origin of Chromatophores in the Plant Kingdom". These new ideas can be studied today under the title of the Theory of Endosymbiosis.

Despite the above studies the dual nature of lichens remained no more than a theory until in 1939 the Swiss researcher Eugen A Thomas was able to reproduce in the laboratory the phenotype of the lichen Cladonia pyxidata by combining its two identified components.

During the 20th century botany and mycology were still attempting to solve the two main problems surrounding lichens. On the one hand the definition of lichens and the relationship between the two symbionts and the taxonomic position of these organisms within the plant and fungal kingdoms. There appeared numerous renowned researchers within the field of lichenology such as Henry Nicollon des Abbayes, William Alfred Weber, Antonina Georgievna Borissova, Irwin M. Brodo, and George Albert Llano.

Lichenology has found applications beyond biology itself in the field of geology in a technique known as lichenometry where the age of an exposed surface can be found by studying the age of lichens growing on them. Age dating in this way can be absolute or relative because the growth of these organisms can be arrested under various conditions. The technique provides an average age of the older individual lichens providing a minimum age of the medium being studied. Lichenometry relies upon the fact that the maximum diameter of the largest thallus of an epilithic lichen growing on a substrate is directly proportional to the time from first exposure of the area to the environment as seen in studies by Roland Beschel in 1950 and is especially useful in areas exposed for less than 1000 years. Growth is greatest in the first 20 to 100 years with 15–50 mm growth per year and less in the following years with average growth of 2–4 mm per year.

The difficulty of giving a definition applicable to every known lichen has been debated since lichenologists first recognised the dual nature of lichens. In 1982 the International Association for Lichenology convened a meeting to adopt a single definition of lichen drawing on the proposals of a committee. The chairman of this committee was the renowned researcher Vernon Ahmadjian. The definition finally adopted was that lichen could be considered as the association between a fungus and a photosynthetic symbiont resulting in a thallus of specific structure.

Such a simple a priori definition soon brought criticism from various lichenologists and there soon emerged reviews and suggestions for amendments. For example, David L. Hawksworth considered the definition imperfect because it is impossible to determine which one thallus is of a specific structure since thalli changed depending upon the substrate and conditions in which they developed. This researcher represents one of the main trends among lichenologists who consider it impossible to give a single definition to lichens since they are a unique type of organism.

Today studies in lichenology are not restricted to the description and taxonomy of lichens but have application in various scientific fields. Especially important are studies on environmental quality that are made through the interaction of lichens with their environment. Lichen is extremely sensitive to various air pollutants, especially to sulphur dioxide, which causes acid rain and prevents water absorption.

Lichens in pharmacology
Although several species of lichen have been used in traditional medicine it was not until the early 20th century that modern science became interested in them. The discovery of various substances with antibacterial action in lichen thalli was essential for scientists to become aware of the possible importance of these organisms to medicine. From the 1940s there appeared various works by the noted microbiologist Rufus Paul Burkholder who demonstrated antibacterial action of lichens of the genus Usnea against Bacillus subtilis and Sarcina lutea. Studies showed that the substance that inhibited growth of bacteria was usnic acid. Something similar occurred with the substance Ramelina synthesised by the lichen Ramalina reticulata, nevertheless, these substances proved ineffective against Gram negative bacteria such as Escherichia coli and Pseudomonas. With these investigations the number of antibacterial substances and possible drug targets known to be produced by lichens increased ergosterol, usnic acid etc.

Interest in the potential of substances synthesised by lichens increased with the end of World War II along with the growing interest in all antibiotic substances. In 1947 antibacterial action was identified in extracts of Cetraria islandica and the compounds identified as responsible for bacterial inhibition were shown to be d-protolichosteric acid and d-1-usnic acid. Further investigations have identified novel antibacterial substances, Alectosarmentin or Atranorin.

Antibacterial action of substances produced by lichens is related to their ability to disrupt bacterial proteins with a subsequent loss of bacterial metabolic capacity. This is possible due to the action of lichen phenolics such as usnic acid derivatives.

From the 1950s the lichen product usnic acid was the object of most antitumour research. These studies revealed some in vitro antitumour activity by substances identified in two common lichens Peltigera leucophlebia and Collema flaccidum.

Recent work in the field of applied biochemistry has shown some antiviral activity with some lichen substances. In 1989 K Hirabayashi presented his investigations on inhibitory lichen polysaccharides in HIV infection.

Bibliography
"Protocols in Lichenology: Culturing, Biochemistry, Ecophysiology and Use in Biomonitoring" (Springer Lab Manuals, Kraner, Ilse, Beckett, Richard and Varma, Ajit (28 Nov 2001)
Lichenology in the British Isles, 1568–1975: An Historical and Biographical Survey, D. L. Hawksworth and M. R. D. Seaward (Dec 1977)
"Lichenology: Progress and Problems" (Special Volumes/Systematics Association) Denis Hunter Brown et al. (10 May 1976)
Lichenology in Indian Subcontinent, Dharani Dhar Awasthi (1 Jan 2000)
Lichenology in Indian Subcontinent 1966–1977, Ajay Singh (1980)
CRC Handbook of Lichenology, Volume II: v.2, Margalith Galun (30 Sep 1988)
A Textbook of General Lichenology, Albert Schneider (24 May 2013)
Horizons in Lichenology D. H. Dalby (1988)
Bibliography of Irish Lichenology, M. E. Mitchell (Nov 1972)
Diccionario de Liquenologia/Dictionary of Lichenology, Kenneth Allen Hornak (1998)
"Progress and Problems in Lichenology in the Eighties: Proceedings" (Bibliotheca Lichenologica), Elisabeth Peveling (1987)
A Textbook of General Lichenology with Descriptions and Figures of the Genera Occurring in the North Eastern United States, Albert Schneider (Mar 2010)
The Present Status and Potentialities of the Lichenology in China, Liu Hua Jie (1 Jan 2000)
Lichens to Biomonitor the Environment, Shukla, D. K. Vertika, Upreti and Bajpai, Rajesh (Aug 2013)
Lichenology and Bryology in the Galapagos Islands with Checklists of the Lichens and Bryophytes thus far Reported, William A. Weber (1966)
Flechten Follmann: Contributions to Lichenology in Honour of Gerhard Follmann, Gerhard Follmann, F. J. A. Daniels, Margot Schultz and Jorge Peine (1995)
Environmental Lichenology: Biomonitoring Trace Element Air Pollution, Joyce E. Sloof (1993)
The Journal of the Hattori Botanical Laboratory: Devoted to Bryology and Lichenology, Zennosuke Iwatsuki (1983)
Contemporary Lichenology and Lichens of Western Oregon, W. Clayton Fraser (1968)
Irish Lichenology 1858–1880: Selected Letters of Isaac Carroll, Theobald Jones, Charles Larbalestier (1996)
Lichens from West of Hudson's Bay (Lichens of Arctic America Vol. 1), John W. Thompson (1953)
Les Lichens - Morphologie, Biologie, Systematique, Fernand Moreau (1927)
"Eric Acharius and his Influence on English Lichenology" (Botany Bulletins), David J. Galloway (Jul 1988)
"Lichenographia Thompsoniana: North American Lichenology in Honour of John W. Thompson", M. G. Gleen (May 1998)
"Monitoring with Lichens-Proceedings of the NATO Advanced Research Workshop", Nimis, Pier Luigi, Scheidegger, Christoph and Wolseley, Patricia (Dec 2001)
Contributions to Lichenology: In Honour of A. Henssen, H. M. Jahns and A. Henssen (1990)
Studies in Lichenology with Emphasis on Chemotaxonomy, Geography and Phytochemistry: Festschrift Christian Leuckert, Johannes Gunther Knoph, Kunigunda Schrufer and Harry J. M. Sipman (1995)
Swedish Lichenology: Dedicated to Roland Moberg, Jan Erik Mattsson, Mats Wedin and Inga Hedberg (Sep 1999)
Index of Collectors in Knowles the Lichens of Ireland (1929) and Porter's Supplement: with a Conspectus of Lichen, M. E. Mitchell, Matilda C. Knowles and Lilian Porter (1998)
Biodeterioration of Stone Surfaces: Lichens and Biofilms as Weathering Agents of Rocks and Cultural Heritage, Larry St. Clair and Mark Seaward (Oct 2011)
The Lichen Symbiosis, Vernon Ahmadjian (Aug 1993)
Lichen Biology, Thomas H. Nash (Jan 2008)
Fortschritte der Chemie organischer Naturstoffe/ Progress in the Chemistry of Organic Natural Products, S. Hunek (Oct 2013)

Notable lichenologists

Lichen collections
British Lichen Society
Botanische Staatssammlung München
Canadian Museum of Nature
Centraalbureau voor Schimmelcultures
National Botanical Research Institute (CSIR), India
Iowa State University, Ada Hayden Herbarium, Ames, Iowa
National Museum Cardiff
Natural History Museum, London
New York Botanical Garden
Royal Botanic Garden, Edinburgh
Royal Botanic Gardens, Kew, London
University of Michigan Herbarium, Ann Arbor, Michigan
Ulster Museum, Belfast

Footnotes

References

External links
American Bryological and Lichenological Society
Belgium, Luxembourg and Northern France, Lichens of
British Lichen Society
Central European Bryological and Lichenological Society (Ger)
Checklists of Lichens and Lichenolous Fungi
Chilean Lichens (Spa)
Czech Bryological and Lichenological Society (Cze)
French Lichenological Society (Fre)
Guide to using a Lichen-Based Index to Assess Nitrogen Air Quality
Identifying North American Lichens a Guide to the Literature
International Association for Lichenology
Irish Lichens 
Italian Lichenological Society (Ita)
Japanese Lichenological Society (Eng)
Japanese Lichenological Society (Eng)
Lichenological Resources (Rus)
Lichen Herbarium University of Oslo
Lichenland Oregon State University
Links to Lichens and Lichenologists
Lichens of Ireland Project 
Microscopy of Lichens (Ger)
Netherlands Bryological and Lichenological Society (nl)
National Biodiversity Gateway
Nordic Lichen Society (Eng)
North American Lichens
Paleo-Lichenology (Ger)
Russian Lichens (Rus)
Scottish Lichens
Swedish Lichens Lief & Anita Stridvall
Swiss Bryological and Lichenological Society (Ger)
Tropical Lichens
UK Lichens

 
Branches of biology
Branches of mycology
Fungi and humans
Mycology